West Saxon may mean:
of or relating to Wessex, the kingdom of the West Saxons
West Saxon dialect of Old English

Language and nationality disambiguation pages